Associazione Sportiva Roma endured possibly its most troubled season ever, in which the club almost went from a genuine title threat to relegation. Despite its eight place, the 18th placed Bologna was only a few points behind in the close table.

The problems started before the season began, with coach Fabio Capello signing for Juventus, and key players Emerson and Walter Samuel departing. That Samuel departed to Real Madrid was greeted with disappointment, but the move was thought to be necessary given the financial struggles of Roma. The moves for Capello and Emerson in contrast, were controversial, with Rome's mayor Walter Veltroni even having to step in to calm feelings down, when Capello had decided to buy Emerson to the Turin club.

Controversy resumed when Roma signed French defender Philippe Mexès from Auxerre, despite a rolling contract. Auxerre took Roma to UEFA court, and in July 2005, Roma was suspended from the transfer market for a full calendar year. In the midst of chaos, new coach Cesare Prandelli decided to resign when finding out his wife was seriously ill (she would survive another two years before dying), and Prandelli returned to football with Fiorentina one year later.

Rudi Völler, formerly a striker at the club, and the man in charge when Germany reached the final of the 2002 FIFA World Cup, took over, but the German did not last long, complaining of a lack of organisation. Former Chievo coach Luigi Delneri, who had been sacked from European champions Porto in pre-season, due to spending too much time in his native Italy, took charge, but the squad lacked confidence, and the scandals and internal fighting caused Roma to slip into the relegation fight. Former club midfielder Bruno Conti saved the club from relegation, owing much to striking duo Vincenzo Montella and Francesco Totti.

A notable incident during the season was referee Anders Frisk being hit by a coin in a Champions League fixture against Dynamo Kyiv, as Roma crashed out of the tournament in its initial phase. Due to Roma's transfer ban, the club could not get rid of Cassano until January 2006, when Real Madrid bought him.

Players

Squad information
Last updated on 29 May 2005
Appearances include league matches only

Competitions

Overall

Last updated: 15 June 2005

Serie A

League table

Results summary

Results by round

Matches

Coppa Italia

Round of 16

Quarter-finals

Semi-finals

Final

UEFA Champions League

Group stage

Statistics

Appearances and goals

|-
! colspan=14 style="background:#B21B1C; color:#FFD700; text-align:center"| Goalkeepers

|-
! colspan=14 style="background:#B21B1C; color:#FFD700; text-align:center"| Defenders

|-
! colspan=14 style="background:#B21B1C; color:#FFD700; text-align:center"| Midfielders

|-
! colspan=14 style="background:#B21B1C; color:#FFD700; text-align:center"| Forwards

|-
! colspan=14 style="background:#B21B1C; color:#FFD700; text-align:center"| Players transferred out during the season

Goalscorers

Last updated: 15 June 2005

Clean sheets

Last updated: 15 June 2005

Disciplinary record

Last updated:

References

A.S. Roma seasons
Roma